The atomic radius of a chemical element is the distance from the center of the nucleus to the outermost shell of an electron.  Since the boundary is not a well-defined physical entity, there are various non-equivalent definitions of atomic radius.  Depending on the definition, the term may apply only to isolated atoms, or also to atoms in condensed matter, covalently bound in molecules, or in ionized and excited states; and its value may be obtained through experimental measurements, or computed from theoretical models. Under some definitions, the value of the radius may depend on the atom's state and context.

Atomic radii vary in a predictable and explicable manner across the periodic table. For instance, the radii generally decrease rightward along each period (row) of the table, from the alkali metals to the noble gases; and increase down each group (column).  The radius increases sharply between the noble gas at the end of each period and the alkali metal at the beginning of the next period.  These trends of the atomic radii (and of various other chemical and physical properties of the elements) can be explained by the electron shell theory of the atom; they provided important evidence for the development and confirmation of quantum theory.

Atomic radius

Note: All measurements given are in picometers (pm). For more recent data on covalent radii see Covalent radius. Just as atomic units are given in terms of the atomic mass unit (approximately the proton mass), the physically appropriate unit of length here is the Bohr radius, which is the radius of a hydrogen atom. The Bohr radius is consequently known as the "atomic unit of length". It is often denoted by a0 and is approximately 53 pm. Hence, the values of atomic radii given here in picometers can be converted to atomic units by dividing  by 53, to the level of accuracy of the data given in this table.

See also
 Atomic radius
 Covalent radius (Single-, double- and triple-bond radii, up to the superheavy elements.)
 Ionic radius

Notes
 Difference between empirical and experimental data: Empirical data basically means, "originating in or based on observation or experience" or "relying on experience or observation alone often without due regard for system and theory data". It basically means that you measured it through physical observation, and a lot of experiments generating the same results. Although, note that the values are not calculated by a formula. However, often the empirical results then become an equation of estimation. Experimental data on the other hand are only based on theories. Such theoretical predictions are useful when there are no ways of measuring radii experimentally, if you want to predict the radius of an element that hasn't been discovered yet, or it has too short of a half-life.
 The radius of an atom is not a uniquely defined property and depends on the definition. Data derived from other sources with different assumptions cannot be compared.
 † to an accuracy of about 5 pm
(b) 12 coordinate
(c) gallium has an anomalous  crystal structure
(d) 10 coordinate
(e) uranium, neptunium and plutonium have irregular structures
Triple bond mean-square deviation 3pm.

References

Data is as quoted at http://www.webelements.com/ from these sources:

Covalent radii (single bond)

Metallic radius

Properties of chemical elements
Chemical element data pages
Atomic radius